When Love Walked In is a 2012 Chinese-Taiwanese co-produced television series starring Victoria Song of f(x), Calvin Chen of Fahrenheit and Zhou Mi of Super Junior-M. The series premiered on GTV on 27 August 2012.

Victoria Song won the Best New Actress award at the China TV Drama Awards.

Synopsis 
Young, talented, and handsome Qin Yujiang (Calvin Chen) receives orders to look for Chairman Yuan's long lost granddaughter, Shen Yayin (Victoria Song). As grandfather tried every means to separate her and her father, Ya Yin often moved houses and hid away from her grandfather since she was young. When her father died, Ya Yin dislikes her grandfather as she feels that he has ruined her childhood happiness and was part of the cause contributing to her father's death. Ya Yin's guardian plotted a plan for her own daughter, Yu Ru (Ya Yin's cousin) to impersonate as Ya Yin to dupe Chairman Yuan into thinking that she is actually his long-lost granddaughter. Yu Jiang gradually enters Ya Yin's heart but refuses to admit his love for her because she's Chairman Yuan's granddaughter. Ya Yin's evil cousin also became an obstacle between Ya Yin and Yu Jiang's love.

Cast 
Victoria Song as Shen Yayin
Xu Yuhan as young Ya Yin
Calvin Chen as Qin Yujiang
Bian Cheng as young Yu Jiang
Zhou Mi as Li Shanglin 
Sean Lee as Gu Qingfeng
Tong Xiaoyan as Chen Yuru 
Emily Cao as Xiao Fen

Soundtrack

Ratings

References

External links 
 

2012 Chinese television series debuts
2012 Taiwanese television series debuts
Gala Television original programming
Chinese romantic comedy television series
Television series by Croton Media